Pierre Cousin (born 14 June 1913, date of death unknown) was a French long-distance runner. He competed in the marathon at the 1948 Summer Olympics.

References

1913 births
Year of death missing
Athletes (track and field) at the 1948 Summer Olympics
French male long-distance runners
French male marathon runners
Olympic athletes of France
Place of birth missing